Gut Feelings is a live album by trumpeter Jack Walrath which was recorded at the Merkin Concert Hall in 1990 and released on the Muse label in 1991.

Reception

The AllMusic review by Scott Yanow stated "Walrath's current group. Carter Jefferson (ts), Anthony Cox (b) are prime players".

Track listing
All compositions by Jack Walrath except where noted
 "The Serpent's Kiss" – 15:36
 "Jump Monk" (Charles Mingus) – 10:56
 "Adagio For Strings And Organ" (Tomaso Albinoni, Remo Giazotto) – 9:01
 "Gagaku (4th movement of Sept Haikai)" (Olivier Messiaen) – 7:06
 "Blues in the Guts" – 9:07
 "Faith" – 17:56

Personnel
Jack Walrath – trumpet 
Carter Jefferson – tenor saxophone, soprano saxophone
Michael Cochrane – piano
Anthony Cox – bass 
Ronnie Burrage – drums
Hiraga Strings: 
Amy Higara – violin, concertmaster
Charles Baker, Bob Shaw, Peter Winograd – violin
Maria Lambros Kannen, David Cerutti – viola
Peter Wyrick, Peter Sanders – cello
Don Sickler - conductor

References

Muse Records live albums
Jack Walrath live albums
1992 live albums